Maia Ann Mereana Lewis  (born 20 June 1970) is a New Zealand former cricketer who played as a right-handed batter. She appeared in 9 Test matches, 78 One Day Internationals and 1 Twenty20 International for New Zealand between 1992 and 2005. She captained in 1997 and between 2003 and 2005. She played domestic cricket for Southern Districts,  Canterbury, North Harbour and Wellington. Lewis also represented New Zealand in Hockey, and Indoor Cricket, making her a triple international athlete.

She retired from cricket in 2005. In the 2006 Queen's Birthday Honours, Lewis was appointed a Member of the New Zealand Order of Merit, for services to women's cricket.

Post-retirement, Lewis has worked as Auckland cricket Women's Cricket Manager and Auckland Hearts coach from 2006 to 2012.  And later in various other sporting roles, including with the Halberg Disability Sport Foundation, and on the boards of Blind Sport New Zealand and Northland Cricket Association.

References

External links
 ESPN CricInfo profile

1970 births
Living people
Cricketers from Christchurch
New Zealand women cricketers
New Zealand women Test cricketers
New Zealand women One Day International cricketers
New Zealand women Twenty20 International cricketers
New Zealand women cricket captains
New Zealand women's Test captains
New Zealand women's One Day International captains
New Zealand women's Twenty20 International captains
Southern Districts women cricketers
Canterbury Magicians cricketers
North Harbour women cricketers
Wellington Blaze cricketers
Members of the New Zealand Order of Merit